In Lithuania, there are around 100 cities (in Lithuanian: singular – miestas, plural – miestai). The term city is defined by the Parliament of Lithuania as compact urban areas populated by more than 3,000 people of whom at least two thirds work in the industry or service sector. Those settlements which have a population of less than 3,000 but historically had city status are still considered to be cities. Smaller settlements are called miestelis (plural miesteliai) which is translated as towns. Even smaller settlements (villages) are called kaimas (plural kaimai). Often the official status is not clear and people refer to both towns and villages as gyvenvietė (plural gyvenvietės) which in essence means settlement.

The cities started to form in the 13th-14th century together with the Grand Duchy of Lithuania. The first to receive city rights was Klaipėda. According to medieval law, a city could have its own fairs, taverns, guilds, courts, etc. Some former cities lost their status and are now just towns or villages, for example Kernavė or Merkinė. Most of the cities in Lithuania were established before the 18th century. Their location is mostly determined by trade and transportation routes. Some of the newer cities grew because of railroad construction, for example Kaišiadorys, Vievis, Radviliškis, Ignalina or Mažeikiai. In the last century cities grew next to big industrial centers, for example Visaginas, Elektrėnai or Naujoji Akmenė. Five cities – Birštonas, Druskininkai, Neringa, Palanga and Anykščiai – have a special resort status.

Most of the cities are small. There are only 14 cities with a population of more than 20,000. Cities are quite evenly spread out through the territory of Lithuania. At the 2001 census 66.7% of the population lived in cities and the percentage is growing.

Cities with over 20,000 inhabitants

Cities with under 20,000 inhabitants

Map
Map showing all cities marked with red dots. Bigger cities are written in larger letters. Click on the map for better resolution.

Gallery

See also
 List of towns in Lithuania (Lithuanian: plural – miesteliai, singular – miestelis)
 List of Lithuanian cities in other languages
 Administrative divisions of Lithuania
 Counties (Lithuanian: singular – apskritis, plural – apskritys)
 Municipalities (Lithuanian: plural – savivaldybės, singular – savivaldybė)
 Elderships (or wards) (eldership, ward) (Lithuanian: plural – seniūnijos, singular – seniūnija).
 Seniūnaitija (sub-eldership)

Notes and sources
 Population sizes are given according to Department of Statistics to the Government of the Republic of Lithuania (Statistics Lithuania) data for the census of 2001. 
 "City rights" means rights to self-governing. For older cities usually it is the date when Magdeburg rights were granted. Most dates are obtained from Lithuanian Wikipedia which assembled the information from several different sources. One of the main sources was Population Statistics. This information cannot be completely trusted.
 Counties, municipalities and elderates are given according to Lithuanian Central Internet Gates data.
 Stasys Vaitiekūnas, Elena Valančienė, Lietuvos geografija (Geography of Lithuania), Alma littera, 2004, pages 160-162. 
 Lietuvos Respublikos teritorijos administracinių vienetų ir jų ribų įstatymas (Republic of Lithuania Law on Administrative Units and Their Borders), Seimas law database, June 19, 1994, law no. I-558.
 At the time of 2001 census, there were 106 cities in Lithuania. Government of Republic of Lithuania made these changes:
 On December 16, 2002 Juodupė lost city status and became a town;
 On February 25, 2003 Kulautuva lost city status and became a town;
 On April 8, 2003 Tyruliai lost city status and became a town.
 Cities without coat of arms image do not have it confirmed by the President of Lithuania. Municipalities share coat of arms with their capitals with the exception of cities which are capitals of more than one municipality (i.e. a city municipality and a district municipality) in which case the city municipality shares the coat of arms with the city, while the district municipality has its own distinct coat of arms. Another notable exception is Trakai town, which has different coat of arms than does its municipality (Trakai District Municipality).

 
Lithuania, List of cities in
Lithuania geography-related lists
Lithuania
Lithuania